Atun may refer to:

People
Hakkı Atun, former prime minister of the Turkish Republic of Northern Cyprus
Norman Atun, Malaysian actor

Fish
Thyrsites atun (also "snoek" or "Cape snoek"), a perch-like commercial food fish in the  family Gempylidae
Atún, Spanish for tuna (e.g. Comisión Interamericana del Atún Tropical)
Other
Atum (also Atem or Tem), deity in Egyptian mythology
Kabushiki-Gaisha Ātūn; see Artoon